Amauria is a genus of flowering plants in the family Asteraceae described as a genus in 1844.

The genus is endemic to the State of Baja California Sur in Mexico.

 Species
 Amauria brandegeana (Rose) Rydb. - Baja California Sur
 Amauria carterae A.M.Powell - Baja California Sur
 Amauria rotundifolia Benth. - Baja California Sur

References

Asteraceae genera
Perityleae
Flora of Baja California Sur